Dogfight is a 1991 period coming-of-age drama film set in San Francisco, California, during the 1960s and directed by Nancy Savoca. The film explores the love between an 18-year-old Marine, Lance Corporal Eddie Birdlace (River Phoenix) on his way to Vietnam, and a young woman, Rose Fenny (Lili Taylor).

Plot
The film begins on November 21, 1963, the day before the assassination of President John F. Kennedy. Lance Corporal Birdlace and three of his Marine buddies have arrived in San Francisco for a twenty-four hour leave before shipping off to Okinawa, and are planning on attending a "dogfight" later  that evening, a party at which Marines compete to bring the ugliest date, unbeknownst to the girls. They separate to look for dates. After a few women reject his advances, Birdlace ducks into a coffee shop, where he encounters Rose, a waitress, on her break, practicing on her guitar. She is not particularly ugly, but rather plain, shy and awkward. Birdlace attempts to charm her, complimenting her on her guitar playing, and invites her to a party. She is suspicious of his motives, but decides to accept his invitation.

While walking to the bar where the dogfight is to be held, Birdlace begins to have second thoughts about playing such a cruel trick on Rose after realizing she's not ugly enough to compete, and attempts to talk her out of going in. However, when they encounter one of Birdlace's buddies and his date in front of the bar, he has no choice but to proceed inside with Rose. Birdlace proceeds to get drunk, presumably feeling guilty. Shortly after, Rose convinces Birdlace to dance with her, though at first he resists because he knows the dance floor is where the dates will be judged. The alcohol and dancing eventually make Rose feel dizzy, and she rushes off to be sick in the rest room. Marcie, the date brought by Birdlace's friend Berzin, is declared the winner. In the ladies' room, it is revealed that Marcie is actually a prostitute whom Berzin has hired, in violation of the rules of the dogfight, cluing Rose in to the true nature of the party. Rose is devastated and tears into Birdlace, then storms off. Birdlace immediately regrets having treated Rose so cruelly, and chases after her. He convinces her to let him buy her dinner in an attempt to make it up to her.

After dinner, the two walk to a club where Rose hopes to perform soon, and then to an arcade. Birdlace is surprised to find himself enjoying spending time with Rose, so much so that he forgets that he was to have met up with his three buddies at a tattoo parlor to get matching tattoos to solidify their friendship. Rose tells Birdlace about her dream of becoming a folk singer, and he reveals to her that he will be shipping off to Okinawa the following day, and from there on to "a little country called Vietnam," he hopes. She offers to write to him, and asks if he will write back. Birdlace walks Rose home, and they share an awkward moment on her doorstep before she hesitantly invites him in. They attempt to talk, but end up having a self-conscious yet tender sexual encounter.

As he is leaving at dawn, Rose gives him her address and asks him to write. Birdlace meets up with his buddies as they board their bus. Birdlace makes up a story about not showing up because he spent the night with the beautiful wife of an officer. Berzin later shares with Birdlace that he saw him with Rose; Birdlace counters that he is aware that Berzin's date, Marcie, was actually a prostitute. They agree to keep one another's secrets, as Birdlace tears up Rose's address and throws it out the window of the bus.

The next day, Rose weeps and watches coverage of President Kennedy's assassination on TV with her mother. Later, in 1966, Birdlace and his three friends have been deployed to Chu Lai, South Vietnam. While playing cards, they are suddenly hit with a mortar, and chaos ensues; Birdlace is wounded in the leg, and Berzin and Oakie drag him away and tell him that Benjamin is dead, before another mortar round hits.

A year later, Birdlace gets off a Greyhound bus in San Francisco. Discharged from the Marines, he now walks with a limp, and it is suggested that his three friends were all killed in combat. He is taken aback by how much things have changed since he was last there, with hippies and flower children everywhere. He walks to the neighborhood where Rose's coffee shop is, and goes to a bar across the street to have a drink. The bartender tells him that Rose's mother has turned the coffee shop over to Rose. Birdlace makes his way across the street and into the coffee shop. Rose, not having heard from him in three years, is surprised to see him, and can only say "hi". She goes over to him, and they embrace.

Cast
 River Phoenix as Eddie Birdlace
 Lili Taylor as Rose Fenny
 E. G. Daily as Marcie
 Richard Panebianco as Berzin
 Anthony Clark as Oakie, one of Birdlace's Marine friends
 Mitchell Whitfield as Benjamin, one of Birdlace's Marine friends
 Holly Near as Rose's mother
 Brendan Fraser as Sailor No. 1, who gets into a fight with the Marines (this is Fraser's debut)
 Jessica Wallenfels as Arcade Girl

Release and reception
The premiere of Dogfight was a screening at the Telluride Film Festival in Colorado on August 30, 1991 with a New York premiere on September 13, 1991. It also had an opening in Los Angeles on September 27, 1991. It was released in the United States on October 4, 1991 by Warner Bros.

The film was widely praised by critics, and has a 79% rating on Rotten Tomatoes. It got a mixed review from Peter Travers, who wrote in Rolling Stone that "Dogfight doesn’t sum up an era; it merely romanticizes it. What could have been an incisive movie about alienation deteriorates into a conventional romance." Kenneth Turan of the Los Angeles Times wrote that "'Dogfight' is two characters in search of a film. And very fine characters they happen to be, as winsome a pair of young people as anyone would ever want to meet. Which makes it all the more a wonder that their on-screen adventures can’t seem to go anywhere at all." Roger Ebert remarked that the film "isn't a love story so much as a story about how a young woman helps a confused teenage boy to discover his own better nature. The fact that his discoveries take place on the night before he ships out to fight the war in Vietnam only makes the story more poignant." Vincent Canby of The New York Times wrote that "Dogfight... seems to have no clear idea of what these ordinary people are really like. The film wants to be honest (and in its cruelties, it is), but the operative sensibility is that of a sitcom world. The characters aren't necessarily idealized, but they are flat and uninteresting. The material is lugubrious. The only seemingly spontaneous moment comes at the very end, which is too late."  Dustin Putman referred to the film as "a virtually unknown gem" and "one of the sweetest, most touching romances of the decade."

The film is recognized by American Film Institute in these lists:
 2002: AFI's 100 Years...100 Passions – Nominated

Soundtrack
The film's soundtrack featured a number of prominent 1960s artists, including Muddy Waters, The Weavers, Van Morrison, Elizabeth Cotten, Pete Seeger and Malvina Reynolds.

Musical adaptation

In June 2012, Second Stage Theatre debuted the musical adaptation. The show, which features music and lyrics by Benj Pasek and Justin Paul and a book by Peter Duchan, was directed by Joe Mantello and choreographed by Christopher Gattelli. It starred Lindsay Mendez as Rose and Derek Klena as Eddie. The cast also included Nick Blaemire, Annaleigh Ashford, Steven Booth, Becca Ayers, Adam Halpin, Dierdre Friel, F. Michael Haynie, James Moye and Josh Segarra. David Zinn designed sets and costumes and Paul Gallo designed the lights. The production opened on July 16, 2012, after previews from June 27, and concluded its limited run on August 19. The show received rave reviews for its young writers and for leading lady Lindsay Mendez's tour de force performance.

Dogfight earned two 2013 Lucille Lortel Awards for Outstanding Musical and Outstanding Choreographer (Christopher Gattelli). It was nominated for five 2013 Outer Critics Circle Awards: Outstanding New Off-Broadway Musical, Outstanding New Score (Broadway or Off-Broadway), Outstanding Book of a Musical (Broadway or Off-Broadway), Outstanding Actress in a Musical (Lindsay Mendez), and Outstanding Lighting Design (Paul Gallo). The show was also nominated for two 2013 Drama League Awards for Outstanding Production of a Broadway or Off-Broadway Musical and Distinguished Performance (Lindsay Mendez), as well as the 2013 Drama Desk Award for Outstanding Actress in a Musical (Lindsay Mendez).

The original cast recording was released on April 30, 2013.

In August 2014, the musical had its European premiere at the Southwark Playhouse in London, directed by Matt Ryan.

References

External links
 
 
 
Dogfight at Allmovie
 Dogfight (musical) at the Music Theatre International website

1991 films
1991 drama films
American drama films
Films set in 1963
Films set in 1966
Films set in 1967
Vietnam War films
Films set in San Francisco
Films set in the San Francisco Bay Area
Films shot in San Francisco
Films directed by Nancy Savoca
Films about the United States Marine Corps
Warner Bros. films
Films adapted into plays
Films scored by Mason Daring
Films set in the 1960s
1990s English-language films
1990s American films